Aleksandr Shkylev (1889 – 1914) was a Russian  Empire fencer. He competed in the individual and team sabre events at the 1912 Summer Olympics.

References

1889 births
1914 deaths
Male fencers from the Russian Empire
Fencers at the 1912 Summer Olympics